The Willsboro School is a historic school building located at Willsboro in Essex County, New York. It was built in 1927 and is a three-story red brick building designed in the Neoclassical style in accordance with New York State's standardized school design guidelines of the early 20th century. An addition was completed in 1952. It closed in 2001.

The former Willsboro School was rescued from the threat of demolition by developer Eli Schwartzberg who established its listing on the National Register of Historic Places in 2010 to ensure the building's preservation.  Schwartzberg then renovated and converted the building into the Champlain Valley Senior Community which opened in 2013.

References

School buildings on the National Register of Historic Places in New York (state)
Neoclassical architecture in New York (state)
School buildings completed in 1927
Buildings and structures in Essex County, New York
National Register of Historic Places in Essex County, New York
1927 establishments in New York (state)